The 2011–12 Heineken Cup pool stage was the first stage of the 17th season of the Heineken Cup, Europe's top competition for rugby union clubs. It involved 24 teams competing for eight quarter-final berths, awarded to the winners of each of six pools plus the two top-ranked second-place teams.  The nest three best runners-up were parachuted into the Amlin Challenge Cup.

The pool stage began with two matches on the evening of 11 November 2011, and ended on Sunday 22 January 2012. The quarter-finalists then participates in a knockout tournament that ultimately ended with the final on Saturday 19 May at Twickenham Stadium in London.

Seeding
The seeding system was the same as in the 2010–11 tournament. The 24 competing teams are ranked based on past Heineken Cup and European Challenge Cup performance, with each pool receiving one team from each quartile, or Tier. The requirement to have only one team per country in each pool, however, still applies (with the exception of the inclusion of the seventh English team).

The brackets show each team's European Rugby Club Ranking at the end of the 2010–11 season.

Pool stage
The draw for the pool stage took place on 7 June 2011. Competition organiser European Rugby Cup (ERC) announced the fixtures, dates, and kickoff times for the first four rounds of pool play on 20 July 2011.

Under ERC rules, tiebreakers within each pool are as follows.
 Competition points earned in head-to-head matches
 Total tries scored in head-to-head matches
 Point differential in head-to-head matches

ERC has four additional tiebreakers, used if tied teams are in different pools, or if the above steps cannot break a tie between teams in the same pool:
 Tries scored in all pool matches
 Point differential in all pool matches
 Best disciplinary record (fewest players receiving red or yellow cards in all pool matches)
 Coin toss

All kickoff times are local to the match location.

Pool 1

Pool 2

Pool 3

Pool 4

Pool 5

Pool 6

See also
 2011-12 Heineken Cup

References

External links
Official ERC website

Pool Stage
Heineken Cup pool stages